Mandy Colleran (born 7 July 1962) is a comic, writer, actress and disability arts activist.

Career 
Mandy Colleran has been involved in disability arts since the 1980s. She is a member of the comedy trio No Excuses along with Mandy Redvers-Rowe and Ali Briggs. In 1986 Colleran became Joint Development Officer of Arts Integration Merseyside (AIM) with John McGrath, it later became North West Disability Arts Forum (NWDAF). In 1990 Colleran became a director of NWDAF.

Credits 
Stage
 2009 DaDaFest Awards, Liverpool (co-presenter)
 2017 In Water I'm Weightless by Kaite O'Reilly. Directed by John McGrath, movement by Nigel Charnock.

Television
 1995 The Alphabet Soup Show (BBC) 

Film

Awards 
 2007 Lifetime Achievement award from DaDaFest

Further reading

References

External links 
 
 

1962 births
20th-century English actresses
21st-century English actresses
21st-century British women writers
Actresses from Liverpool
British feminists
British people with disabilities
British stand-up comedians
British disability rights activists
English stage actresses
English women comedians
Living people
British socialist feminists